The 1999 Winston 500 was the 30th race of the 1999 NASCAR Winston Cup Series season, held on Talladega Superspeedway over 188 laps. Dale Earnhardt, Sr. would win his second to last Talladega win in this race.

Entry list

Qualifying 

PR: provisional

Failed to qualify, withdrew, or driver changes:   Bobby Gerhart (#89), Robert Pressley (#77), Darrell Waltrip (#66), Hut Stricklin (#58)

Results

References

NASCAR races at Talladega Superspeedway
1999 NASCAR Winston Cup Series
October 1999 sports events in the United States